German submarine U-1102 was a Type VIIC U-boat of Nazi Germany's Kriegsmarine during World War II.

Construction 
The U-1102 was laid down on 16 April 1943 at the Nordseewerke shipyard in Emden, Germany. She was launched on 15 January 1944 and commissioned on 22 February 1944 under the command of Oberleutnant zur See Bernhard Schwarting.

She was assessed at  submerged. She had two shafts and two  propellers.

The submarine was fitted with five  torpedo tubes (four fitted at the bow and one at the stern), fourteen torpedoes, one  deck gun (220 rounds), one  Flak M42 and two twin  C/30 anti-aircraft guns. The boat had a complement of 44 to 57 men.

Service history And Accident 
U-1102 was used as a Training ship in the 8th U-boat Flotilla from 22 February 1944 until 12 May 1944. On 24 March 1944, the U-boat sank during a diving accident at the U-boat base quay in Pillau. Two crew members were lost in the incident and U-1102 was raised and decommissioned on 12 May 1944. She was brought to Danzig for repairs and returned to service as a school boat on 15 August 1944 under the command of a new commander Oberleutnant zur See Erwin Sell.

Capture And End 
U-1102 surrendered on 13 May 1945 in the Hohwacht Bay, Germany to the Allied Forces. The submarine was transferred to Wilhelmshaven via Kiel and was transferred to Loch Ryan on 23 June 1945. She stayed in Loch Ryan until her sinking in Operation Deadlight (post-war Allied operation) on 21 December 1945, when she was towed to sea by the British destroyer .

U-1102 was sunk at 15:05 on 21 December 1945 in the North Atlantic, North-West off the coast of Ireland by naval gun fire from the Polish destroyer , the British destroyers  and HMS Zetland and the British sloop .

Wreck 

References

Bibliography

German Type VIIC submarines
U-boats commissioned in 1944
World War II submarines of Germany
Ships built in Emden
U-boats scuttled in 1945
Operation Deadlight
Shipwrecks in the Atlantic Ocean
1944 ships
Maritime incidents in March 1944
Maritime incidents in May 1944
Maritime incidents in December 1945